Ponni is a Malayalam novel written by Malayattoor Ramakrishnan in 1967. It is based on the lifestyle of Adivasis of Attappady at Malleswaram Hills of Mannarkkad.

Plot summary
The novel portrays the life of the Adivasis of Attappadi, a region in Malabar, to the south of the Nilgiris and to the east of Kerala. Slash and burn cultivation practised by the Adivasis is suddenly stopped by the Government, forcing them to search for new jobs. The hero changes his hair style to suit the times. The courtship dance and traditional songs were depicted in a realistic way. Ponni'''s characters talked and sang a mixture of Tamil and Malayalam with a tinge of Kannada.

Writing
The novel was inspired by true stories. In his partial autobiography Service Story Ente IAS Dinangal, Malayattoor Ramakrishnan says that the novel was inspired by true stories narrated by his friend Pareeth. Pareeth was working as a gramasevak in Attappady when Malayattoor was the sub-collector of Ottappalam sub-division (from 1959 to 1961). Several characters of the novel are based on real-life characters. The character of sub-collector (which was inspired by Malayattoor himself) and Adhikari (which was inspired by Basavayyan Chettiyar) are examples.

Film adaptation

A 1976 film adaptation titled Ponni'' starred Kamal Haasan and Lakshmi. The film was shot in forest areas of Palakkad and at Satya, Gemini, AVM, and Karpakam Studios.

References 

1967 novels
Malayalam novels
Indian autobiographical novels
Novels by Malayattoor Ramakrishnan
Novels set in Kerala
Culture of Palakkad district
DC Books books
1967 Indian novels